The 2016–17 Robert Morris Colonials men's basketball team represented Robert Morris University during the 2016–17 NCAA Division I men's basketball season. The Colonials, led by seventh-year head coach Andrew Toole, played their home games at the Charles L. Sewall Center in Moon Township, Pennsylvania as members of the Northeast Conference. The Colonials also hosted two home games at PPG Paints Arena. They finished the season 14–19, 9–9 in NEC play to finish in a three way tie for fifth place. After tiebreakers, they received the 7 seed in the NEC tournament where they defeated LIU Brooklyn in the quarterfinals to advance to the semifinals where they lost to Mount St. Mary's.

Previous season 
The Colonials finished the 2015–16 season 10–22, 8–10 in NEC play to finish in eighth place. They lost in the quarterfinals of the NEC tournament to Wagner.

Roster

Schedule and results

|-
!colspan=9 style=| Non-conference regular season

  

  

|-
!colspan=9 style=| NEC regular season

|-
!colspan=9 style=| NEC tournament

References

Robert Morris Colonials men's basketball seasons
Robert Morris
Robert Morris
Robert Morris